A gharry or gharri is a horse-drawn cab used especially in India. A palkee gharry is shaped like a palanquin. A gharry driver is a gharry-wallah.

See also
 Carriage

Carriages